Anthony Daly (died 1820) was a native of Rahruddy, a townland west of Loughrea, County Galway, Ireland, and a leader of the local Whiteboy movement.  Daly was hanged on the Hill of Seefinn in 1820 for attempted murder.

Samuel Barber composed a significant choral work, "Anthony O Daly", lamenting his death, based on a poem of retribution by Antoine Ó Raifteiri translated by James Stephens in his collection, Reincarnations.

Numerous literary references have been made to Daly, including in John Steinbeck's short nonfiction work The Ghost of Anthony Daly.

See also

 Andrew Ó hAughegan
 Neddy Lohan

1820 deaths
Year of birth missing
People from County Galway
Irish rebels